Jakiri is a town and commune in Cameroon.  It lies on the Ring Road in the Northwest Region.  Its central roundabout is the intersection of roads heading to Foumban, Kumbo, and Bamenda.

Villages of Jakiri
Beside Jakiri town, the subdivision comprises the following villages:

Dzekwa
Ber
Kiluun-Shiy
Kinsenjam
Kwanso
Limbo
Mbokam
Mbokija
Mensai
Nkar
Nkarkui
Nkartsen
Nooy
Ntotti
Ntseimbang
Ntur
Roontong
Sop
Tan
Vekovi
Wainamah
Wasi
Wvem
Yer

See also
Communes of Cameroon

References

External links
 Site de la primature - Élections municipales 2002 
 Contrôle de gestion et performance des services publics communaux des villes camerounaises  - Thèse de Donation Avele, Université Montesquieu Bordeaux IV 
 Charles Nanga, La réforme de l’administration territoriale au Cameroun à la lumière de la loi constitutionnelle n° 96/06 du 18 janvier 1996, Mémoire ENA. 

Communes of Northwest Region (Cameroon)